Hwange Colliery Company Limited is the name of a company in Zimbabwe and of its associated coal mining , processing and marketing.  It was founded in 1899.  Mining operations are located near Hwange (called until 1982 Wankie) in the province of Matabeleland North.  The company's headquarters are in Hwange and registered office the capital Harare and a regional office in Bulawayo.Its stock is listed on the Zimbabwe Stock Exchange and is a component of its stock index, the Zimbabwe Mining Index.  It is also listed on the London Stock Exchange and Johannesburg Stock Exchange.

Coal transportation is by road and rail. The Colliery owns its own railway system. Handover station to NRZ is Thomson Junction
Hwange Colliery Company Limited operate an open cast mine and underground mine. The town Hwange is a town that grew form the mining of coal in the area
GPS Coordinates 18°23′0.155″S 26°28′12.03″E.

In 1972 a mining disaster struck the number 2 colliery at Hwange.

External links

Hwange Colliery Company Limited

Hwange
Companies listed on the Zimbabwe Stock Exchange
Coal companies of Zimbabwe